The 1990 Coca-Cola 600 was the tenth stock car race of the 1990 NASCAR Winston Cup Series season and the 31st iteration of the event. The race was held on Sunday, May 27, 1991, before an audience of 160,000 in Concord, North Carolina, at Charlotte Motor Speedway, a 1.5 miles (2.4 km) permanent quad-oval. The race took the scheduled 400 laps to complete. In a one-lap shootout to the finish, Blue Max Racing driver Rusty Wallace would manage to fend off the field to complete a dominant run throughout the race, leading 306 of the 400 laps in the race. The victory was Wallace's 17th career NASCAR Winston Cup Series victory and his first victory of the season. To fill out the top three, Melling Racing driver Bill Elliott and Roush Racing driver Mark Martin would finish second and third, respectively.

Background 

Charlotte Motor Speedway is a motorsports complex located in Concord, North Carolina, United States 13 miles from Charlotte, North Carolina. The complex features a 1.5 miles (2.4 km) quad oval track that hosts NASCAR racing including the prestigious Coca-Cola 600 on Memorial Day weekend and the NEXTEL All-Star Challenge, as well as the UAW-GM Quality 500. The speedway was built in 1959 by Bruton Smith and is considered the home track for NASCAR with many race teams located in the Charlotte area. The track is owned and operated by Speedway Motorsports Inc. (SMI) with Marcus G. Smith (son of Bruton Smith) as track president.

Entry list 

 (R) denotes rookie driver.

Qualifying 
Qualifying was split into two rounds. The first round was held on Wednesday, May 23, at 3:00 PM EST. Each driver would have one lap to set a time. During the first round, the top 20 drivers in the round would be guaranteed a starting spot in the race. If a driver was not able to guarantee a spot in the first round, they had the option to scrub their time from the first round and try and run a faster lap time in a second round qualifying run, held on Thursday, May 24, at 2:00 PM EST. As with the first round, each driver would have one lap to set a time. For this specific race, positions 21-40 would be decided on time, and depending on who needed it, a select amount of positions were given to cars who had not otherwise qualified but were high enough in owner's points; up to two were given.

13 drivers would fail to qualify.

Full qualifying results

Race results

Standings after the race 

Drivers' Championship standings

Note: Only the first 10 positions are included for the driver standings.

References

Coca-Cola 600
Coca-Cola 600
NASCAR races at Charlotte Motor Speedway
May 1990 sports events in the United States